The Old Burying Ground is a historic cemetery on Pleasant and William Streets in Stoneham, Massachusetts.  Established in 1726, it is the only surviving element of Stoneham's original town center, which also included a meeting house and school.  It contains about 450 stones and fragments, with grave markers dating from 1728 to 1924.  The stones were carved with motifs that were fairly typical of the period including urns, willows, cherubs, and winged death heads.

The cemetery was listed on the National Register of Historic Places in 1984.

See also
National Register of Historic Places listings in Stoneham, Massachusetts
National Register of Historic Places listings in Middlesex County, Massachusetts

References

External links
 Old Burying Ground, Town of Stoneham, MA
 

1726 establishments in Massachusetts
Cemeteries on the National Register of Historic Places in Massachusetts
Buildings and structures in Stoneham, Massachusetts
Cemeteries in Middlesex County, Massachusetts
National Register of Historic Places in Stoneham, Massachusetts